Events in the year 1881 in Spain.

Incumbents
Monarch: Alfonso XII
Prime Minister: Práxedes Mateo Sagasta

Events
Spanish general election, 1881

Births
October 25 - Pablo Picasso, painter (d. 1973 in France)

References

 
1880s in Spain